Aasland is a Norwegian-language surname. Notable people with the surname include:

Aaslaug Aasland (1890–1962), Norwegian politician
Ann-Mari Aasland (1915–2008), Norwegian politician
Arthur J. Aasland (1934–2016), Norwegian businessperson
Gunnar Aasland (born 1936), Norwegian judge
Karl Aasland (1918–1982), Norwegian politician
Lasse Aasland (1926–2001), Norwegian politician
Øyvind Aasland (born 1967), Norwegian darts player
Terje Aasland (born 1965), Norwegian politician
Tora Aasland (born 1942), Norwegian politician

See also 

Norwegian-language surnames